Root of spinal nerve may refer to:

 Dorsal root of spinal nerve
 Ventral root of spinal nerve